Brandon William Jones (born May 7, 1988) is an American actor, musician, model, and producer. He is best known for his role as Liam in Lie to Me, Andrew Campbell in Pretty Little Liars, Liam in The Fosters, and Charlie Russell in CSI: Crime Scene Investigation.

Early life and career
Jones was born in Greensboro, North Carolina and was raised in the nearby town of McLeansville by parents Kimberly and Reid Jones.  He has no siblings.  At Northeast Guilford High School, Jones was involved in sports as a member of the football, track, and wrestling teams. In early 2009, Jones drove cross country from his East Coast home to move to Los Angeles and began acting soon after.

Jones shot with photographer Bruce Weber for the 2010 Abercrombie & Fitch holiday campaign. He is also featured as the lead vocalist on the 2011 single "Wanna Be Known" by German electronic music duo York.

In October 2011, it was announced that Jones would be joining CSI: Crime Scene Investigation, playing the role of Charlie Russell, the son of D.B. Russell (played by Ted Danson). E! Online reported in early August 2012 that Jones would guest star on Pretty Little Liars as the role of Andrew Campbell. He appeared in the web series If I Can Dream alongside Justin Gaston.

Jones also appeared in Unbreakable Kimmy Schmidt as Cyndee's fiancé.

Personal life
In 2017, Jones pleaded no contest to misdemeanor charges of assault with a firearm. The incident stemmed from a 2015 altercation with a neighbor, where Jones pulled out a handgun. The actor had a similar incident in 2016, when he waved a knife in his neighbor's face. Jones served a 180 day sentence, along with 30 days of community service and anger management classes.

Filmography

Film

Television

Web

Discography
 "Wanna Be Known" (York featuring Brandon Jones) (2011)
 "In the Moment" (featuring Jade Villalon) (2012)

References

External links
 

1988 births
21st-century American male actors
American film producers
American male film actors
American male television actors
American male sport wrestlers
Living people
Male actors from North Carolina
Musicians from Greensboro, North Carolina
Players of American football from North Carolina
Songwriters from North Carolina
21st-century American guitarists
Male models from North Carolina
Guitarists from North Carolina
American male guitarists
21st-century American singers
21st-century American male singers
American male songwriters